Julie Thompson Klein (December 8, 1944—January 15, 2023) was a professor and scholar in the field of Interdisciplinary Studies at Wayne State University.  Klein was widely known as a pioneer in interdisciplinary education, and had consulted widely in academic and other settings in the field.  In 2016, she was a speaker at the Centennial Symposium of the Association of American Colleges and Universities.  During her 36 years at Wayne state, her publications had been heavily cited.

Publications (partial)

Books:
 
 
 
 
 
 Interdisciplining Digital Humanities: Boundary Work in an Emerging Field. University of Michigan Press. 2015. .

Articles:
 "Interdisciplinarity and complexity: An evolving relationship." structure 71 (1984): 72.
 "Blurring, cracking, and crossing: Permeation and the fracturing of discipline." Knowledges: Historical and critical studies in disciplinarity (1993): 185-214.
 "Prospects for transdisciplinarity." Futures 36.4 (2004): 515-526.
 "Integrative learning and interdisciplinary studies." Peer Review 7, no. 4 (2005): 8-10.
 "A platform for a shared discourse of interdisciplinary education." JSSE-Journal of Social Science Education 5, no. 4 (2006).
 "Afterword: the emergent literature on interdisciplinary and transdisciplinary research evaluation." Research Evaluation 15, no. 1 (2006): 75-80.
 "Evaluation of interdisciplinary and transdisciplinary research: a literature review." American Journal of Preventive Medicine 35, no. 2 (2008): S116-S123.

See also
HASTAC, the Humanities Arts Science and Technology Alliance and Collaboratory.

References

External links
 Curriculum Vitae

Living people
1944 births
Wayne State University faculty